The 1964–65 Idaho Vandals men's basketball team represented the University of Idaho during the 1964–65 NCAA University Division basketball season. Charter members of the Big Sky Conference, the Vandals were led by second-year head coach Jim Goddard and played their home games on campus at the Memorial Gymnasium in Moscow, Idaho. They were 6–19 overall and 4–6 in conference play.

References

External links
Sports Reference – Idaho Vandals: 1964–65 basketball season
Gem of the Mountains: 1965 University of Idaho yearbook – 1964–65 basketball season
Idaho Argonaut – student newspaper – 1965 editions

Idaho Vandals men's basketball seasons
Idaho 
Idaho
Idaho